Vericeras is an extinct genus of actively mobile carnivorous cephalopod, essentially a Nautiloid, that lived in what would be Europe during the Silurian from 421—418.7 mya, existing for approximately .

Taxonomy 
Vericeras was assigned to Orthocerida by Sepkoski (2002).

Morphology
The shell is usually long, and may be straight ("orthoconic") or gently curved.  In life, these animals may have been similar to the modern squid, except for the long shell.

Fossil distribution
Fossil distribution is exclusive to Sardinia.

References

Prehistoric nautiloid genera
Silurian animals
Prehistoric animals of Europe
Orthocerida